The South Fork of the Grand River is a tributary of the Grand River, approximately 90 mi (145 km) long, in South Dakota in the United States.

It rises in the Badlands of northwestern South Dakota, south of the Cave Hills in western Harding County, and flows east past Buffalo, then past several units of the Grand River National Grassland in northern Perkins County. It joins the North Fork in the Shadehill Reservoir near to form the Grand, which is a tributary of the Missouri.

See also
List of rivers of South Dakota

References

External links

Rivers of South Dakota
Rivers of Harding County, South Dakota
Rivers of Perkins County, South Dakota
Tributaries of the Missouri River